Polymer80, Inc. is an American manufacturer of parts kits containing firearm parts including unfinished receivers (also known as "80 percent" receivers) used for making privately made firearms. The company was founded in 2013 by Loran Kelley Jr. and David Borges and is headquartered in Dayton, Nevada. Polymer80 has received press coverage because of the use of their products in crimes involving so-called "ghost guns", which in specific cases has resulted in lawsuits being brought against the company.

Background

Under U.S. federal law, the creation and possession of firearms for non-commercial purposes (i.e. personal use) is legal, and a license is generally not required if the created weapon will not be transferred in, for example, a sale. In contrast, since 1968, persons intending to manufacture firearms for sale or distribution must have a Federal Firearms License, and each firearm must bear a unique serial number.

Under U.S. law, only a particular part of a weapon is considered to be a "firearm", most often the receiver. This can be completed from raw material, an "unfinished receiver", or a so-called "80 percent receiver", though the last of these being a non-legal term the Bureau of Alcohol, Tobacco, Firearms and Explosives, or ATF, does not recognize.  While some states have passed laws restricting the creation of privately made firearms, unfinished receivers are typically sold without the requirement of federal or state background checks. However, some scholars have argued that the existing state regulations may be unconstitutional. Finishing work on these receivers may be performed with machine tools, a common drill press, or hand-held rotary tools such as the popular Dremel. Companies typically sell kits that include drill bits, stencils, or jigs to aid the process, with basic proficiency with those tools required. Starting from the 2010s, 80% completed polymer frames became more popular, requiring only hand tools to finish them. Companies such as Polymer80 became well known for being a top producer of 80% frames compatible with Glock Gen 3 parts and above.

History

The company was founded by Loran Kelley Jr. and David Borges in March 2013. The first project undertaken by the company was an injection molded AR-15 rifle lower receiver. The company then moved to AR-10 style rifle lower receivers, and finally pistol receivers. The name of the company refers to the injection molding process combined with the common designation of unfinished receivers as "80% receivers".

The first version of the Glock compatible handgun debuted in 2016, with a follow up that arrived in 2017. The company expanded the options available to consumers in 2019 by offering more Glock compatible frames in more colors and with more options for grip feel.

In 2019, Defense Distributed announced that their Ghost Gunner automated CNC milling machines would be able to mill Glock 19-style Polymer80 compact frames.

The company markets their kits as, "Buy Build Shoot."

Co-founder David Borges retired in 2021. Loran Kelley Sr., who became a partner in the first year of Polymer80, passed away in January 2022. Loran Kelly Jr. is the current President and CEO of the company.

Products 

Polymer80 sells a variety of lower frames and receivers compatible with various models of Glock handguns. They include:

 PF940v2 - full frame pistol kit, compatible with Glock 17, 34, 17L in 9x19 mm; Glock 22, 35, 24 in .40 S&W; and Glock 31 in .357 SIG
 PF940c - compact pistol kit, compatible with Gen3 Glock 19 in 9x19 mm and Glock 23 in .40 S&W
 PF940sc - subcompact kit, compatible with Glock 26, chambered in 9x19 mm 
 PF9SS - subcompact kit, compatible with Glock 43, Gen 4, chambered in 9x19 mm
 PF45 - large frame, compatible with Glock G21SF, chambered in .45 ACP

Controversies
The ATF raided the company's headquarters on December 10, 2020.  Washington, D.C. Attorney General Karl Racine filed a civil lawsuit against the company for advertising its products within D.C. in June 2019, apparently for the company violating D.C.'s gun laws.

The company sought to intervene in a lawsuit brought forth by the state and parents of the victims in the 2019 Saugus High School shooting against the Department of Justice for their failure to classify ghost guns like the type Polymer80 sells as firearms under federal law.

In February 2021, the Los Angeles City Attorney Mike Feuer announced that the city along with advocacy group Everytown Law filed a lawsuit against the company for allegedly selling their kits in violation of federal and state law. In June 2021, two Los Angeles County Sheriff's Department deputies injured in a shooting by a felon using a Polymer80 handgun sued the company for "negligently and unlawfully [selling] an untraceable home-assembled gun kit that resulted in the September attack in Compton."

According to The Daily Beast, Polymer80 received a $371,000 PPP loan in mid-2021 for their reported 31 employees during the COVID-19 pandemic.

The company opposed a Nevada state law that would criminalize ghost gun sellers and buyers. The law was struck down by Nevada's state courts, which then CEO David Borges called "a significant victory".

The LAPD reported that nearly 90 percent of ghost guns recovered by the department in 2021 were from Polymer80.

The city of Baltimore filed a lawsuit against the company for making worse a "public health crisis" of violence associated with the use of ghost guns. The lawsuit was filed on 1 June 2022, the same day that Maryland's law reclassifying "unfinished receivers" as firearms went into effect.

A 2022 study collected data about firearms recovered by police after being used in a crime. In the twelve American cities studied, Polymer80 was the fifth most commonly found brand, at 3.8%.

Nevada Legislature Assembly Bill 286 to prohibit the sale of ghost guns and the parts used to make them passed on May 21, 2021.

References

External links 
 
 ATF determination letter on the classification of Polymer80's products as not firearms 
 Complaint against Polymer80 from two Los Angeles County sheriff’s deputies
 ATF application for December 2020 search warrant
 Complaint by the state of California against Polymer80
 President Biden on Combatting Gun Violence on C-SPAN, displays a "Buy-Build-Shoot" kit at 18:22

Firearm manufacturers of the United States
Companies based in Nevada